Duggan is a residential neighbourhood in south Edmonton, Alberta, Canada.  The neighbourhood is "named for J.J. Duggan (a pioneer citizen and former mayor of Edmonton's early rival, the City of Strathcona)".

The community is represented by the Duggan Community League, established in 1971, which maintains a community hall and outdoor rink located at 106 Street and 37 Avenue.

Demographics 

According to the 2001 federal census, the bulk of residential construction occurred during the 1960s and 1970s when two out of every three homes (67%) were constructed.  Residential construction tapered off in the early 1980s when another 7.1% of residences were built.  There was a sharp increase in construction in the neighbourhood during the late 1990s when a further 15.9% of residences were built.

According to the 2016 municipal census, the most common type of residence in the neighborhood is the single-family dwelling, which accounts for approximately six out of ten (59%) of residences.  Another three out of ten (31%) are apartments in low-rise buildings with fewer than five stories.  Most of the remaining 10% are row houses.  Approximately half of residences (52%) are owner-occupied, while a third (35%) are rented.

The population is relatively stable with just under half (44.1%) of the population has lived in the neighborhood for five years or longer.  Another 8.9% have lived in the neighborhood for three to five years.

There are two schools in the neighborhood.  Duggan Elementary School, for grades one to six, is operated by the Edmonton Public School System, while St. Augustine Catholic Elementary School is operated by Edmonton's Catholic School System.

Residents have good access along 111 Street to Southgate Centre.

111 Street also gives residents access to the LRT stations at Southgate and Century Park.

The average household incomes in Duggan in 2001 were a bit higher than the average household income for the entire city.

The neighborhood is bounded on the west by 111 Street, on the east by Calgary Trail, on the south by 34 Avenue, and on the north by 40 Avenue, 106 Street, and a line running half a block north of 41 A Avenue.

Surrounding neighbourhoods

See also 
 Edmonton Federation of Community Leagues

References

External links 
 Duggan Neighbourhood Profile

Neighbourhoods in Edmonton